Claudio Paul Sanchez III (born March 12, 1978) is an American writer and musician of Puerto Rican and Italian descent best known for being the lead singer, guitarist and primary lyricist for the alternative/progressive rock group Coheed and Cambria. He is the creator of the comic book series The Amory Wars, as well as Key of Z and Kill Audio, both co-written with his wife Chondra Echert. Sanchez co-authored the novel Year of the Black Rainbow with Peter David.

Musical career
Sanchez primarily provides lead vocals and guitar in Coheed and Cambria. However, he has also used theremins, synthesizers and harmonicas in his side projects. Early in his career, Sanchez first performed with several different bands, all of which lasted a short period of time.

After breaking up with Beautiful Loser, Sanchez went on a trip to Paris, where he began writing a story, initially referred to as The Bag.On.Line Adventures of Coheed and Cambria, named after a store near where Sanchez stayed while in Paris. Two characters named Coheed and Cambria Kilgannon live in a fictional foreign galaxy known as Heaven's Fence. In the original concept, Sanchez wrote a story about his girlfriend and himself traveling to a new, foreign place, but as the concept expanded the characters started to resemble his parents.

Sanchez was the lead singer and guitarist for Shabütie, which formed in Nyack, New York, in 1995. Shabutie released several EPs and wrote several songs which would eventually be released on The Second Stage Turbine Blade. The band broke up after Nate Kelley walked out on a performance but was later reformed with Josh Eppard replacing Nate Kelley on drums. This new band was dubbed Coheed and Cambria, named after the characters Sanchez had written about in Paris. Coheed and Cambria achieved success on the East Coast after releasing and touring The Second Stage Turbine Blade, and they gained mainstream success with the release of In Keeping Secrets of Silent Earth: 3 thanks to the single "A Favor House Atlantic".

Comics
Sanchez began producing comic books in 2000, beginning with The Bag.On.Line Adventures. The Bag.On.Line Adventures lasted two issues due to problems with the artist, deadlines, and financial issues. Sanchez's next project was the graphic novel Good Apollo, I'm Burning Star IV, Volume One: From Fear Through the Eyes of Madness. The graphic novel was released alongside the album of the same name, however, Sanchez has stated that the novel was incomplete due to financial issues.

Sanchez began anew in 2008 with the series The Amory Wars, which chronicles events album by album. The Second Stage Turbine Blade was covered in two five-part comic book limited series. Alongside Peter David, Sanchez co-wrote the novel The Amory Wars: Year of the Black Rainbow, chronicling the events of the Year of the Black Rainbow album. Sanchez also released a twelve-issue comic book series adapting In Keeping Secrets of Silent Earth: 3 under the Amory Wars name. A forthcoming adaptation of the Good Apollo 1 storyline was foreshadowed at the end of the twelfth issue.

Under the Evil Ink Comics label, he has also produced Kill Audio (2009), Key of Z (2011), and Translucid (2014) with Chondra Echert.

Other work
Sanchez also performs in a side project called The Prize Fighter Inferno. The band is a concept band based on the character Jesse, a boxer known as the Prize Fighter Inferno. The story focuses on The Blood Machine, a vicious contraption that murders its victims and takes their souls. Sanchez also released a two-song 7" vinyl album titled The Beaver Records EP, which is associated with Kill Audio and The Prize Fighter Inferno. On September 8, 2012, Sanchez released a six-song nonconceptual EP, Half Measures, under his side project The Prize Fighter Inferno. On April 23, 2021, Sanchez released a new full-length album under The Prize Fighter Inferno entitled The City Introvert.

References

External links

1978 births
21st-century American singers
American male guitarists
American male singers
American musicians of Puerto Rican descent
American people of Italian descent
American rock guitarists
American rock singers
American tenors
Coheed and Cambria members
Countertenors
Guitarists from New York (state)
Living people
People from Nyack, New York
People from Suffern, New York
Progressive metal guitarists
Progressive rock guitarists
Rhythm guitarists
Singers from New York (state)
Sony BMG artists
The Amory Wars